Public Delivery is an organization for contemporary art, founded in Seoul, South Korea in 2011. They organize exhibitions, initiate non-institutional art projects and distribute artwork. Their focus is on public space however they work in a variety of mediums.

In 2012 they organized both Asia and the world's tallest mural in Busan, South Korea. Between 2011 and 2014 they have organized 73 performances in public space and 37 exhibitions in museums and galleries around the world.

Its founder, Martin Schulze of Germany, currently resides in Seoul, South Korea where he handles the organization in its entirety.

Selected Projects/Exhibitions 

 Live at the Museum (An ongoing series of video works by Andre Hemer in front of numerous museums around the world.)
 El Choco (First major solo exhibition by Swiss-Bolivian artist Luciano Calderon taking place in La Paz, Bolivia)
 Counter Parts (Group show in Forum Kunst in Rottweil, Germany)
 Silence Was Golden (Site-specific and participatory project giving individuals and communities the opportunity to express themselves using golden balloons. Involving Pulitzer Prize  winners, National Geographic photographers, the NBA and more.)
 Freedumb (Pop-up graffiti exhibition taking place simultaneously on six different continents.)

References

External links
 Public Delivery
 Martin Schulze

Arts organizations
Contemporary art organizations
Culture of Seoul
Murals in South Korea